Fedra may refer to:

 , ship which hit the rocks in Gibraltar in 2008
 Italian for Phaedra
 Fedra (Mayr), 1820 opera by Simon Mayr
 Fedra (Pizzetti), 1915 opera by Ildebrando Pizzetti, based on a 1909 play of the same name by Gabriele D'Annunzio
 Fedra Sans and Fedra Serif, font families marketed by Typotheque
 Fedra (film), a 1956 Spanish drama film

See also
 Fedara, village in India
 FEDRA